Flash Gordon Ramsay Street is the fourth studio album by the Australian skate punk band The Decline, released on August 30, 2019 on Pee Records and distributed internationally by Thousand Island Records (North America), Bearded Punk Records (Europe) and Disconnect Records (UK).

The album was tracked, mixed and engineered by Brody Simpson and Mark McEwen at Underground Studios in Booragoon, Western Australia in 2018.

The album contains 17 songs, and features guest vocals from Nuno Pereira (A Wilhelm Scream), Stacey Dee (Bad Cop/Bad Cop) and Noah Skape (FAIM).

Track listing

Personnel 
 Pat Decline – Vocals, guitar
 Ben Elliott – Vocals, guitar, piano, acoustic guitar
 Ray Ray – Bass
 Harold Holt – Drums
 Brody Simpson – Production, Engineering, Editing & Mixing
 Mark McEwen - Production, Engineering, Editing & Mixing
 Simon Strothers – Mastering
 Pete Pee – Independent Licensing
 Stacey Dee – Guest Vocals in “Verge Collection”
 Nuno Pereira - Guest Vocals in “WAR”
 Noah Skape  - Guest Vocals in “Don’t Jump A Giftshark In The Mouth”
 Annie Walter – Artwork, layout and labelling

Songwriting 
The Music for Flash Gordon Ramsay Street was written cooperatively by all four members of The Decline, whereas the melody and lyrics for the majority of the songs were written by Pat Decline & Ben Elliott. Bullet With Buffalo Wings, Brovine, Verge Collection, Changing My Shoes, Get Hyrule Save Zelda & Josh were written by Ben Elliott, while It Was Always You, War, Smashed Avo, Real Again, High Extinction, I'm Not Alright, Don't Jump A Giftshark In The Mouth & Your Funeral were written by Pat Decline. The More You Know was written by Ray Ray.

References 

2019 albums